Bertram Myron Gross (1912 in Philadelphia – March 12, 1997 in Walnut Creek, California) was an American social scientist, federal bureaucrat and Professor of Political Science at Hunter College (CUNY). He is known from his book Friendly Fascism: The New Face of Power in America from 1980, and as primary author of the HumphreyHawkins Full Employment Act.

Early life and education 
Gross was born in Philadelphia. He received his B.A. in English and philosophy and his M.A. in English from the University of Pennsylvania.

Career
In the late 1930s, he started as a federal bureaucrat in Washington. From 1941 to 1945 he was a staff member of a number of Senate committees. Here he wrote the Roosevelt-Truman full employment bills of 1944 and 1945, which led to the Employment Act of 1946. From 1946 to 1952 he was executive secretary of the President's Council of Economic Advisers and was among those who advocated making Gross National Product a key measurement of the economy, which he later regretted. "I was one of the key figures pressing for it then. Who knew that pushing for growth would distort all human values and priorities?," he said.

In 1953, he moved with his family to Israel, where he served as an economic advisor in the Prime Minister's Office and as a Visiting Professor at the Hebrew University, where he established their program in Public Administration. He returned to the United States in the 1960s and joined the faculty of Syracuse University in the Maxwell School of Citizenship and Public Affairs. In 196162, he was a Fellow at the Center for Advanced Study in the Behavioral Sciences, Palo Alto; and, in 196263, he was the Leatherbee Lecturer at the Harvard Business School.

In 1970, Bertram Gross was president of the Society for General Systems Research. From 1970 to 1982 he was Distinguished Professor of Political Science and Urban Affairs at Hunter College and the CUNY Graduate Center.

Personal life
He was married to Nora Faine Gross and is survived by his second wife, Kusum Singh. He was the father of four sons, including Nobel Prize winner David J. Gross. Since 1999, the Campaign to Abolish Poverty/Full Employment Coalition presents the annual Bertram Gross Award.

Publications 
Gross has written several books and articles. A selection:
 1953, "The Legislative Struggle: A Study in Social Combat", New York: McGraw Hill.
 1954, The hard money crusade, with Wilfred Lumer, Washington: Public Affairs Institute.
 1963, An annotated bibliography on national economic planning, Syracuse, N.Y.: Maxwell Graduate School of Citizenship and Public Affairs.
 1964, The managing of organizations: The administrative struggle New York: Free Press of Glencoe.
 1966, The state of the nation : social systems accounting, New York : Tavistock Publications, 1966, 166 p.
 1967, (eds.) Social goals and indicators for American society, Philadelphia: American Academy of Political and Social Science.
 1967, Action under planning: The guidance of economic development, New York: McGraw-Hill Book Co.
 1968, Organizations and their managing, New York: Free Press.
 1968,  A great society?, New York: Basic Books.
 1970, Political intelligence for America's future, with Michael Springer, Philadelphia: None.
 1978, The Legislative Struggle: A Study in Social Combat,Reprint of 1953 book. Conn.: Greenwood Press.
 1980, Friendly Fascism: The New Face of Power in America, New York: M. Evans.
 1993, Legislative strategy: Shaping public policy, with Edward V. Schneier, New York: St. Martin's Press.
 1993, Congress today, with Edward V. Schneier, New York: St. Martin's Press.
 1993, Human rights for the 2lst century, foundations for responsible hope: A U.S. post Soviet dialogue Armonk,, with Peter H. Juviler, V.A. Kartashkin & E.A. Lukasheva (eds.), New York: M.E. Sharpe.

References

External links 
 Friendly Fascism: The New Face of Power in America at Google Books

1912 births
1997 deaths
American economics writers
American political writers
American anti-globalization writers
Hunter College faculty
Academic staff of the Hebrew University of Jerusalem
Syracuse University faculty
American systems scientists
Jewish systems scientists
Jewish American social scientists
20th-century American non-fiction writers
20th-century American male writers
American male non-fiction writers
Harvard Business School people
20th-century American Jews
Presidents of the International Society for the Systems Sciences